Sidi Fredj, known under French rule as Sidi Ferruch, is a coastal town in Algiers Province, Algeria. It is located within the territory of the municipality of Staouéli, on a presque-isle on the Mediterranean Sea. It is the site of the ancient city and bishopric Obori, which remains a Catholic titular see.

History 
Obori was important enough in the Roman province of Mauretania Caesariensis to become one of the many suffragans of its capital Caesarea Mauretaniae's Metropolitan Archbishopric, but faded like most sees in Roman Africa.

Sidi Fredj was the landing spot where the French established their beachhead for the Invasion of Algiers in 1830. A number of ships of the French Navy were subsequently named Sidi Ferruch, the colonial name of the town under French rule, in honour of the event.

Titular see 
The diocese was nominally restored in 1933 as the titular bishopric of Obori (Latin) / Obori (Curiate Italian) / Oboritan(us) (Latin adjective).

It has had the following incumbents, so far of the fitting episcopal (lowest) rank :
 James Francis Carney (1966.01.07 – 1969.01.08) as Auxiliary Bishop of Vancouver (Canada) (1966.01.07 – 1969.01.08), next succeeding as Metropolitan Archbishop of Vancouver (1969.01.08 – death 1990.09.16)
 Luigi Zanzottera, Oblates of Saint Joseph (O.S.J.) (1969.03.13 – death 2005.01.18), as Auxiliary Bishop of Huaraz (Peru) (1969.03.13 – 1970.05.31) and on emeritate
 Juan José Pineda Fasquelle, Claretians (C.M.F.) (2005.05.21 – ...), Auxiliary Bishop of Tegucigalpa (Honduras).

See also 

List of lighthouses in Algeria
 List of Catholic dioceses in Tunisia

References

External links 
 GCatholic 

Populated coastal places in Algeria
Cities in Algeria